Ashes (Fraxinus species) are used as food plants by the larvae (caterpillars) of a number of Lepidoptera species, including the following. (Unless otherwise stated, records are from the Nearctic region.)

Adelidae
 Adela croesella – UK record

Apatelodidae
 Apatelodes torrefacta
 Olceclostera angelica
 Olceclostera seraphica – recorded on Fraxinus greggii and Fraxinus pennsylvanica

Arctiidae

 Scarlet tiger moth (Callimorpha dominula) – Finland record
 Banded (or pale) tussock moth (Halysidota tessellaris) – recorded on Fraxinus americana and Fraxinus pennsylvanica
 Confused haploa moth (Haploa confusa) – recorded on Fraxinus nigra
 Fall webworm (Hyphantria cunea) – recorded on F. americana, Fraxinus excelsior, F. nigra, F. pennsylvanica and Fraxinus velutina
 Hickory tussock moth (Lophocampa caryae) – recorded on F. americana
 Spotted tussock moth (Lophocampa maculata) – recorded on F. nigra, F. americana and F. pennsylvanica
 Ruby tiger (Phragmatobia fuliginosa)
 Dark-spotted tiger moth (Spilosoma canescens) – Australian record
 Pink-legged tiger moth (Spilosoma latipennis)
 Virginian tiger moth or yellow bear (Spilosoma virginica) – recorded on F. americana and F. pennsylvanica

Brahmaeidae
 Brahmaea wallichii – recorded on Fraxinus micrantha in India

Coleophoridae
 Coleophora badiipennella – Palaearctic record

Cossidae
 Goat moth (Cossus cossus) – recorded on Fraxinus excelsior in the Old World
 Prionoxystus macmurtrei
 Prionoxystus robiniae – recorded on Fraxinus pennsylvanica
 Leopard moth (Zeuzera pyrina) – Palaearctic and Nearctic records

Crambidae
 Neargyractis slossonalis
 Splendid palpita moth (Palpita magniferalis) – recorded on Fraxinus americana, Fraxinus nigra and F. pennsylvanica
 Palpita nigropunctalis – recorded on Fraxinus mandschurica in Japan

Geometridae

 Abraxas grossulariata – recorded on Fraxinus lanuginosa in Japan
 Fall cankerworm (Alsophila pometaria) – recorded on Fraxinus americana, Fraxinus nigra and Fraxinus pennsylvanica
 Anacamptodes ephyraria – recorded on F. americana and F. pennsylvanica
 Anavitrinella pampinaria
 Lilac beauty (Apeira syringaria) – UK record
 Carsia sororiata
 Red-green carpet (Chloroclysta siterata) – recorded on Fraxinus excelsior in Finland
 Cingilia catenaria
 Feathered thorn (Colotois pennaria) – recorded on F. lanuginosa in Japan

 Engrailed (Ectropis crepuscularia) – recorded on F. pennsylvanica
 Large thorn (Ennomos autumnaria) – Japanese record
 Dusky thorn (Ennomos fuscantaria) – recorded on F. excelsior in Europe
 Ennomos magnaria – recorded on F. americana and F. pennsylvanica
 Ennomos subsignaria – recorded on F. nigra and F. americana
 November moth (Epirrita dilutata)
 Erannis tiliaria – recorded on F. americana
 Euchlaena effecta – recorded on F. americana
 Euchlaena johnsonaria – recorded on F. americana
 Euchlaena marginaria – recorded on F. americana
 Ash pug (Eupithecia innotata f. fraxinata) – recorded in the UK
 Eutrapela clemataria – recorded on F. pennsylvanica
 Hypagyrtis unipunctata – recorded on F. pennsylvanica
 Lambdina fervidaria

 Brindled beauty (Lycia hirtaria) – recorded on Fraxinus mandschurica in Japan
 Lycia ursaria – recorded on F. americana
 Melanolophia canadaria – recorded on F. americana and F. pennsylvanica
 Metanema determinata – recorded on F. pennsylvanica
 Nematocampa filamentaria – recorded on F. americana and F. pennsylvanica
 Nemoria mimosaria – recorded on F. pennsylvanica
 Scalloped hazel (Odontopera bidentata) – recorded on F. excelsior in Europe

 Winter moth (Operophtera brumata) – recorded on F. americana, F. excelsior (in Europe) and F. pennsylvanica
 Spring cankerworm (Paleacrita vernata) – recorded on F. nigra, F. americana and F. pennsylvanica
 Twin-spot carpet (Perizoma didymata) – recorded on F. excelsior in Finland
 Philtraea latifoliae – recorded on Fraxinus latifolia
 Plagodis fervidaria
 Plagodis kuetzingi
 Probole alienaria
 Psyra bluethgeni – recorded on Fraxinus sieboldiana in Japan
 Lunar thorn (Selenia lunularia) – recorded on F. excelsior in Europe
 Purple thorn (Selenia tetralunaria) – recorded on F. excelsior in Finland
 Sicya macularia – recorded on F. americana and F. pennsylvanica
 Tetracis cachexiata
 Barred tooth-striped (Trichopteryx polycommata) – recorded in the UK
 Tissue (Triphosa dubitata) – recorded on F. excelsior in Finland
 Wilemania nitobei – recorded on Fraxinus longicuspis in Japan

Gracillariidae
 Caloptilia albicapitata – recorded on Fraxinus chinensis and Fraxinus mandschurica in Japan
 Caloptilia arsenievi – recorded on Fraxinus americana (in Japan), F. chinensis (in Japan), F. mandschurica (in Japan and the former USSR) and Fraxinus pennsylvanica (in Japan)
 Caloptilia cuculipennella – Holarctic
 Ash leaf cone roller (Caloptilia fraxinella) – recorded on F. americana and Fraxinus nigra
 Caloptilia syringella – recorded on Fraxinus excelsior (Holarctic) and F. nigra
 Caloptilia ussuriella – recorded in the former USSR on F. americana, F. chinensis, F. mandschurica and F. pennsylvanica (all in Japan)
 Marmara basidendroca – recorded on F. pennsylvanica
 Marmara corticola – recorded on F. pennsylvanica
 Marmara fraxinicola – recorded on F. americana and F. pennsylvanica

Lasiocampidae

 Malacosoma americana – recorded on Fraxinus americana
 Malacosoma californica
 Forest tent caterpillar (Malacosoma disstria) – recorded on F. americana, Fraxinus nigra and Fraxinus pennsylvanica
 Phyllodesma americana – recorded on F. americana
 Phyllodesma carpinifolia
 December moth (Poecilocampa populi) – recorded on F. excelsior in Finland
 Tolype velleda – recorded on F. americana and F. pennsylvanica

Limacodidae
 Hag moth (Phobetron pithecium)

Lycaenidae
 Coreana raphaelis – recorded on Fraxinus chinensis (in Japan and Russia), Fraxinus lanuginosa and Fraxinus mandschurica (both in Japan)
 Laeosopis roboris – recorded on Fraxinus excelsior in Spain
 Banded hairstreak (Satyrium calanus)
 Hickory hairstreak (Satyrium caryaevorum) – recorded on Fraxinus americana and Fraxinus nigra
 Satyrium liparops
 Ussuriana michaelis – recorded on F. chinensis (in Russia) and F. lanuginosa (in China); also recorded in Korea and Japan
 Ussuriana stygiana – recorded on F. chinensis, F. lanuginosa, Fraxinus longicuspis, F. mandschurica, Fraxinus platypoda and Fraxinus sieboldiana (all) in Japan
 Ussuriana takarana – recorded on Fraxinus insularis in Taiwan

Lymantriidae

 Brown-tail (Euproctis chrysorrhoea) – recorded on Fraxinus americana
 Gypsy moth (Lymantria dispar) – recorded on F. americana, Fraxinus nigra, Fraxinus profunda and Fraxinus quadrangulata; also recorded in the Palaearctic
 Black arches (Lymantria monacha) – recorded on Fraxinus excelsior in the Palaearctic
 Rusty tussock moth or vapourer (Orgyia antiqua)
 White-marked tussock moth (Orgyia leucostigma) – recorded on F. americana and F. excelsior

Megalopygidae
 Southern flannel moth, puss moth, puss caterpillar or asp (Megalopyge opercularis) – recorded on Fraxinus berlandieriana

Nepticulidae
 Stigmella apicialbella

Noctuidae
 Abagrotis alcandola
 Abagrotis alternata
 Achatia distincta – recorded on Fraxinus americana
 American dagger moth (Acronicta americana) – recorded on Fraxinus pennsylvanica
 Acronicta impleta
 Acronicta radcliffei
 Knot grass (Acronicta rumicis) – Finnish record
 Fringe-tree sallow moth (Sympistis chionanthi) – recorded on F. americana, Fraxinus nigra and F. pennsylvanica
 The Brick (Agrochola circellaris) – UK record
 Amphipyra glabella

 Copper underwing (Amphipyra pyramidea)
 Centre-barred sallow (Atethmia centrago) – recorded in the UK
 Blue underwing or Clifden nonpareil (Catocala fraxini) – recorded on Fraxinus excelsior in Finland
 Catocala habilis – recorded on F. pennsylvanica
 Red underwing (Catocala nupta) – Indian record
 Catocala piatrix
 Catocala ultronia – recorded on F. pennsylvanica
 Copivaleria grotei – recorded on F. americana
 Coronet (Craniophora ligustri) – recorded on F. excelsior in Finland; also recorded in the UK
 Crocigrapha normani – recorded on F. americana and F. pennsylvanica
 Small angle shades (Euplexia lucipara) – Old World record
 Satellite (Eupsilia transversa) – recorded on F. excelsior in Finland
 Harrisimemna trisignata
 Homoncocnemis fortis – recorded on Fraxinus latifolia
 Lithophane antennata
 Lithophane bethunei – recorded on F. americana
 Lithophane georgii
 Lithophane laticinerea – recorded on F. americana
 Lithophane petulca – recorded on F. americana and F. pennsylvanica
 Tawny pinion (Lithophane semibrunnea) – recorded on F. excelsior in the UK
 Lithophane socia – German record
 Melanchra assimilis – recorded on F. americana
 Oncocnemis punctilinea
 Orthosia garmani
 Orthosia hibisci – recorded on F. americana and F. pennsylvanica
 Orthosia revicta – recorded on F. americana
 Palthis angulalis – recorded on F. americana
 Ash tip borer (Papaipema furcata) – recorded on F. americana, F. nigra and F. pennsylvanica
 Papaipema nebris
 Paracentropus cyrus – Iranian record
 Psaphida styracis
 Flame brocade (Trigonophora flammea) – UK record

Nolidae
 Baileya dormitans

Notodontidae
 Datana contracta
 Datana integerrima
 Datana ministra – recorded on Fraxinus quadrangulata
 Heterocampa guttivitta – recorded on Fraxinus americana and Fraxinus pennsylvanica
 Hyperaeschra georgica
 Rough prominent (Nadata gibbosa) – recorded on F. americana
 Red-humped caterpillar moth (Schizura concinna) – recorded on F. pennsylvanica
 Schizura ipomoeae – recorded on F. americana

Nymphalidae

 Blackvein sergeant (Athyma ranga) – recorded on Fraxinus retusa in Hong Kong
 Baltimore checkerspot butterfly (Euphydryas phaeton) – recorded on Fraxinus americana
 Scarce fritillary (Euphydryas maturna) – recorded on Fraxinus excelsior in Finland and the former Yugoslavia
 Mourning cloak or Camberwell beauty (Nymphalis antiopa) – recorded on F. americana

Oecophoridae
 Antaeotricha leucillana – recorded on Fraxinus americana
 Gold-striped leaftier moth (Machimia tentoriferella) – recorded on F. americana and Fraxinus nigra

Papilionidae

 Eastern tiger swallowtail (Papilio glaucus) – recorded on Fraxinus americana, Fraxinus caroliniana, Fraxinus pennsylvanica and Fraxinus nigra
 Two-tailed swallowtail (Papilio multicaudata) – recorded on Fraxinus anomala, Fraxinus latifolia, Fraxinus oregana, F. pennsylvanica and Fraxinus viridis
 Western tiger swallowtail (Papilio rutulus)

Psychidae
 Oiketicus kirbyi – recorded on Fraxinus uhdei in Costa Rica
 Evergreen bagworm (Thyridopteryx ephemeraeformis) – recorded on Fraxinus americana

Pyralidae
 Acrobasis caryivorella – recorded on Fraxinus pennsylvanica
 Euzophera nelliella – North African record
 Euzophera pinguis – recorded on Fraxinus excelsior in the UK
 Phycita meliella – Palaearctic record

Saturniidae

 Adetomeris erythrops – Neotropical record
 Polyphemus moth (Antheraea polyphemus)
 Atlas moth (Attacus atlas) – recorded on Fraxinus pennsylvanica in Hong Kong
 Attacus lorquinii – Indo-Australian records
 Io moth (Automeris io) – recorded on Fraxinus americana, Fraxinus pubescens and Fraxinus sambucifolia
 Promethea silkmoth (Callosamia promethea)
 Regal moth (Citheronia regalis) – recorded on F. americana
 Epiphora antinorii – recorded on Fraxinus berlandieriana in Kenya
 Eupackardia calleta – recorded on Fraxinus velutina
 Cecropia moth (Hyalophora cecropia) – recorded on F. americana and F. pennsylvanica

 Emperor moth (Pavonia pavonia) – Palaearctic record
 Rothschildia aurota – Neotropical record
 Rothschildia cinctus
 Rothschildia jorulla
 Rothschildia lebeau – recorded on Fraxinus berlandieriana
 Rothschildia orizaba – recorded on F. americana
 Samia cynthia
 Samia walkeri
 Saturnia atlantica – recorded on Fraxinus berlandieriana in the Palaearctic
 Saturnia huttoni – Palaearctic record
 Great peacock moth (Saturnia pyri) – recorded on Fraxinus excelsior in the Palaearctic

Sesiidae
 Paranthrene asilipennis
 Podosesia aureocincta
 Ash borer (Podosesia syringae) – recorded on Fraxinus americana, Fraxinus caroliniana, Fraxinus excelsior, Fraxinus nigra and Fraxinus pennsylvanica
 Sesia apiformis

Sphingidae

 Elm sphinx (Ceratomia amyntor)
 Ceratomia sonorensis
 Waved sphinx (Ceratomia undulosa) – recorded on Fraxinus americana, Fraxinus excelsior, Fraxinus nigra, Fraxinus pennsylvanica and Fraxinus platycarpa
 Manduca brontes – recorded on F. americana, F. excelsior and F. platycarpa
 Ash sphinx (Manduca jasminearum)
 Rustic sphinx (Manduca rustica)
 Paonias excaecata
 Twin-spotted sphinx (Smerinthus jamaicensis) – recorded on F. americana
 Canadian sphinx (Sphinx canadensis) – recorded on F. americana and F. nigra
 Great ash sphinx (Sphinx chersis) – recorded on F. americana, F. pennsylvanica and Fraxinus velutina; also recorded in Mexico
 Franck's sphinx (Sphinx franckii) – recorded on F. americana
 Sphinx gordius
 Laurel sphinx (Sphinx kalmiae) – recorded on F. americana, F. nigra and Fraxinus sambucifolia
 Incense cedar sphinx (Sphinx libocedrus) – recorded on Fraxinus greggii
 Privet hawkmoth (Sphinx ligustri) – recorded on F. excelsior in Finland; also recorded in the UK
 Elegant sphinx (Sphinx perelegans) – recorded on F. excelsior

Tineidae
 Crypsithyris longicornis – recorded on Fraxinus americana in India
 Tinea cherota – recorded on Fraxinus floribunda in India

Tortricidae

 Amorbia humerosana
 Aphelia alleniana
 Archips argyrospila
 Archips breviplicanus – recorded on Fraxinus lanuginosa in Japan
 Archips cerasivorana – recorded on Fraxinus pennsylvanica
 Archips crataegana – recorded on Fraxinus excelsior in the UK
 Archips purpurana
 Archips rosana – recorded on F. excelsior in the UK
 Archips xylosteana – recorded on F. excelsior in Europe
 Choristoneura rosaceana – recorded on Fraxinus americana
 Clepsis persicana
 Cydia ingrata – recorded on F. pennsylvanica
 Doloploca praeviella – recorded on Fraxinus mandschurica in Japan
 Eulia ministrana – recorded on F. excelsior in Europe
 Hedya dimidioalba – "Holarctic" record
 Orthotaenia undulana – recorded on F. pennsylvanica
 Pammene suspectana – recorded on F. excelsior in Europe; also UK records
 Pandemis canadana – recorded on F. americana
 Pandemis cerasana – Indian record
 Pandemis corylana – recorded on F. excelsior in Europe; also Japanese record
 Pandemis lamprosana – recorded on F. americana and Fraxinus texensis
 Tufted apple bud moth (Platynota idaeusalis) – recorded on Fraxinus nigra
 Pseudargyrotoza conwagana – recorded on F. excelsior in Europe; also UK record
 Poplar leafroller (Pseudosciaphila duplex) – recorded on F. nigra and F. pennsylvanica
 Rhopalovalva pulchra – recorded on F. mandshurica in Japan
 Rhopobota naevana – recorded on F. mandshurica in Japan
 Sparganothis diluticostana – recorded on F. americana
 Sparganothis reticulatana – recorded on F. americana
 Sparganothis unifasciana

Yponomeutidae
 Prays curtisella – recorded on Fraxinus excelsior in the UK
 Ash bud moth (Prays fraxinella) – recorded on F. excelsior in the UK
 Prays ruficeps – recorded from the former Czechoslovakia
 Zelleria hepariella – recorded on F. excelsior in the UK

External links

Ash
+Lepidoptera